Becket Fabrice-Martial Godo (born 14 March 2003), known as Martial Godo, is an English professional footballer who plays as a midfielder for Fulham.

Career
Godo left Margate in March 2022 to sign for Championship side Fulham, following a successful trial period.

Career statistics
.

Notes

References

Living people
2003 births
English people of Ivorian descent
English footballers
Association football midfielders
Isthmian League players
Dartford F.C. players
Margate F.C. players
Fulham F.C. players